The Kingdom of Brahmachal, also known as Badapanchala, was one of the many petty kingdoms of the Sylhet region. It was established by Brahmajit by gradually off-shooting from the Gour Kingdom in 1170 AD due to familial tensions. It would reunite during the reign of Govardhan of Gour for a few years before being annexed to the Twipra Kingdom. Govardhan's successor, Gour Govinda, would again reunite Brahmachal with Gour in 1260.

Location
The kingdom consisted mainly of the northern parts of the modern-day Moulvibazar District, with its capital at Brahmachal (modern-day Baramchal in Kulaura) - from which it takes its name. The Kingdom of Tungachal, part of modern-day Habiganj District, was a vassal state to Brahmachal as well.

History

Establishment
Before the establishment of the Brahmachal Kingdom, the area was a part of the Gour Kingdom. In 1140 AD, Kshetra Pal ascended the Gour throne. Raja Kshetra Pal practised polygyny and had two wives; Ratnavati and Surama. During his reign, an earthquake took place which changed the country's contour and topography. It is said that a new river emerged in the town, which the King named after his second and favourite wife, Rani Surama, as the Surma River. The King's first son came from Surama and his name was Brahmajit. A few years later, Kshetra's first wife Ratnavati also gave birth to a son, called Dharmadhwaj. However, conspiracies emerged in the country as a number of people were suspicious of Ratnavati accusing her of jealousy and child illegitimacy as Kshetra was an old man by this time. After Kshetra died, his eldest son, Brahmajit stepped to the throne. His stepmother Ratnavati and her associates gave Brahmajit a hard time as she believed that as she was the elder wife, her son should have been the King.

Scared for his life, Brahmajit moved his capital to a place known as Brahmachal (now Baramchal, Kulaura), just north of the Twipra Kingdom. He then appointed his stepbrother Dharmadhwaj to govern over the old capital, which retained its name as Gour. Conflict did not emerge as both rulers thought that they were in control of the kingdom as a whole, but gradually the two lands split to become two different kingdoms; Gour and Brahmachal. The two stepsons worked together and hosted a Vedic yajna at the Bhatera Homer Tila at Brahmachal which was arranged by Priest Nidhipati Shastri, who was a descendant of Ananda Shastri - a Brahmin from Mithila who arrived in Sylhet during the rule of Govinda-Rana Kesava Deva of Gour. Another yajna was hosted by Raja Sengkwchak Dharmadhar of the Twipra Kingdom with Nidhipati as a priest as well who was rewarded with what would become the Ita Kingdom.

Brahmajit was succeeded by his son, Indrajit and then Jayananda. Jayananda had two sons; Srinanda and Upananda. Srinanda suffered from chronic rheumatism. Upananda is described in the Hattanath Tales as evil and jealous individual as he took advantage of this by conspiring with military general Amar Singh against his brother. Upananda succeeded in becoming with the acceptance of the royal officers and kept Singh as his commander-in-chief. Srinanda protested against this but was unsuccessful and subsequently migrated to Kamrup where he became a sannyasi of Kamakhya Temple, leaving behind his wife, Anna Purna - a neglected ex-wife of Raja Gai Gobind of the Jaintia Kingdom - and his son, Govinda. It is said that here, Srinanda gained a better reputation and was even considered by some Hindus to be God of the Sea and Pura Raja.

Loss of Independence

Govardhan of Gour rose to power in 1250 following the death of his father. During this period, Upananda was the Raja of Brahmachal (centred in modern-day Baramchal in Kulaura). The long-lasted conflict between the north and south continued during Govardhan's reign. Govardhan appointed his chief minister, Madan Rai, to somehow find a way to lure Upananda's general, Amar Singh, to use him as a tool to infiltrate Brahmachal. Govardhan and Rai then made an agreement with Govardhan's general Virabhadra to give his daughter, Chandra Kala, in marriage to Singh. The marriage was successful, despite protests, and Singh maintained a good relationship with General Virabhadra and a developing relationship with the Gour royal court. Singh had close ties with the Kuki chiefs, the border guards for the Twipra Kingdom south of Brahmachal. He managed to persuade the Kuki chiefs into raiding Raja Upananda's palace in the dead of the night, massacring most of its inmates. With the emergence of a civil war between Brahmachal and Gour, Raja Upananda was subsequently killed. Brahmachal became a part of the Gour kingdom again, and Govardhan appointed Amar Singh as its feudal governor.

The Raja of the Twipra Kingdom, Ratan Manikya was informed of Singh's treacherous actions and how he tricked the Kuki chiefs, he decided that he has to take action. He was also told of the murder of Raja Epivishnu of Tungachal, who was a subordinate ruler within the Brahmachal Kingdom and was a friend of the latter. Ratan believed the Gour administration was going too far and decided to also put a stop to Govardhan's scheme to invade other neighbouring kingdoms. He sent a contingent towards Brahmachal to attack Amar Singh. Singh's forces were outnumbered and requested assistance from Govardhan. However, Govardhan was unable to help as Gour was facing an invasion in the north from the Jaintia Kingdom. Singh was killed by the Tripura forces and the Kuki chiefs saw this as an opportunity for them to annex Brahmachal to the Twipra Kingdom. Jaidev Rai, son of the minister of Raja Upananda, who was the king of Brahmachal before Amar Singh, was made the feudal ruler of the area under the Tripuris. 

In 1260, Govinda of Gour rose to power following the murder of Raja Govardhan. He intended to retrieve the territories which had been lost during the reign of the former king. By making peace with Ratan Manikya of Tripura and gifting him an elephant, Govinda was able to retrieve Brahmachal (which included Tungachal) back to the Gour administration. During the Conquest of Sylhet in 1303, Brahmachal was incorporated into Shamsuddin Firuz Shah's sultanate.

List of rulers

See also
History of Sylhet

References

Moulvibazar District
History of Sylhet